Prolixocupes lobiceps is a species of reticulated beetle in the family Cupedidae. It is found in North America.

References

Further reading

External links

 

Cupedidae
Articles created by Qbugbot
Beetles described in 1874
Beetles of North America